Shweta Mohan (born 19 November 1985) is an Indian playback singer. She has received four Filmfare Awards South for Best Female Playback Singer, one Kerala State Film Awards and one Tamil Nadu State Film Awards. She has recorded songs for film music and albums in all the four South Indian languages namely, Malayalam, Tamil, Telugu, Kannada along with the Hindi language and has established herself as a leading playback singer of South Indian cinema. Some of her inspirations are Sujatha Mohan (her mother), Shreya Ghoshal, Alka Yagnik and K.S. Chitra

Shweta Mohan has sung title songs for more than 50 serials in Sun TV and Vijay TV since 2002. Her most notable title song was for the serial Thirumathi Selvam in Sun TV.

Film Songs

1995

2003

2006

2007

2008

2009

2010

2011

2012

2013

2014

2015

2016

2017

2018

2019

2020

2021

2022

2023

Non-film songs

2007

2013

2016

2018

2019

2021

References

External links 
 Tamil songs by Shweta Mohan on Raaga

Tamil
Mohan, Shweta